Harry Eugene "Sid" Varney (December 22, 1927 – November 25, 2011) was an American football coach.  He served as the head football coach at Elon University from 1953 until 1959, compiling a record of 24–36–2.

Head coaching record

References

External links
 
 

1927 births
2011 deaths
American football guards
Baseball catchers
Elon Phoenix football coaches
Greensboro Patriots players
Greenville Greenies players
North Carolina Tar Heels baseball players
North Carolina Tar Heels football players
Presbyterian Blue Hose football coaches
Raleigh Capitals players
Wilson Tobs players
People from Towanda, Pennsylvania
Players of American football from Pennsylvania
Baseball players from Pennsylvania